The Hundred of Reynolds is a cadastral hundred of the County of Victoria, South Australia.

References

Reynolds
1869 establishments in Australia